The 1985 African Men's Handball Championship was the sixth edition of the African Men's Handball Championship, held in Luanda, Angola, from 14 to 23 September 1985. It acted as the African qualifying tournament for the 1986 World Championship in Switzerland.

In the final, Algeria win their third consecutive title beating Tunisia in the final game.

Qualified teams

 

Other teams intended to participate:

Group stage

Group A

Group B

Knockout stage

Semifinals

Third place game

Final

Final ranking

References

African handball championships
Handball
A
Handball in Angola
20th century in Luanda
African Men's Handball Championship, 1985
African Men's Handball Championship